Herpetological Conservation and Biology is a peer-reviewed open access scientific journal established in 2006 that covers the conservation, management, and natural history of reptiles and amphibians. It publishes up to three regular issues per year as well as occasional monographs.

History and production 
The journal was established in 2006, with the first issue appearing in September. In 2012 it was included in the Journal Citation Reports. In September 2014, the journal became an incorporated nonprofit corporation.

The editor-in-chief is R. Bruce Bury (US Geological Survey). The journal is open access and does not charge article processing fees or per-page costs to authors, without any limitations on article length. The journal has been cited as a successful model of low-cost academic publishing with production costs, paid by the editorial staff, of around US$100 per year.

Abstracting and indexing 
The journal is abstracted and indexed in:

According to the Journal Citation Reports, the journal has a 2014 impact factor of 0.595.

References

External links 
 

Herpetology journals
Open access journals
Publications established in 2006
English-language journals